Partido Liberal may refer to:

 Liberal Party of Corrientes (Argentina)
 Liberal Party (Bolivia)
 Liberal Party (Brazil)
 Liberal Party (Brazil, 1831)
 Liberal Party (Brazil, 1985)
 Liberal Party (Brazil, 2006)
 Liberal Party (Chile, 1849–1966)
 Liberal Party (Chile, 2007–)
 Colombian Liberal Party
 Liberal Party (Honduras)
 Liberal Party (Paraguay)
 Liberal Party (Peru)
 Liberal Party (Philippines)
 Liberal Party of Puerto Rico
 Liberal Party (Spain, 1880), 1880–1931 - liberal political party of the Restoration
 Liberal-Conservative Party, 1876–1931 - conservative political party of the Restoration
 Liberal Party (Spain, 1976) - political party created in 1976, revived in 1983 and merged into the People's Party in 1989
 Liberal Party (Uruguay)
 Great Liberal Party of Venezuela (Venezuela)

See also 

 Liberal Party